The Ministry of Education ( or MINEDUC) is a government ministry of Guatemala, headquartered in Zone 10 of Guatemala City.

Notes

External links
 Ministry of Education 
Government of Guatemala
Education ministries